Death in Paradise is a British–French crime comedy drama created by Robert Thorogood. The show is set in the fictional Caribbean island of Saint Marie, and is filmed in Guadeloupe. The series focuses on a detective inspector (DI) from the UK and his police team solving murder mysteries on the fictional Caribbean island. 

The programme's main character has been portrayed by Ben Miller as DI Richard Poole (Series 1–3), Kris Marshall as DI Humphrey Goodman (Series 3–6), Ardal O'Hanlon as DI Jack Mooney (Series 6–9) and Ralf Little as DI Neville Parker (Series 9–). 

The secondary main character is a female detective sergeant (DS), who has been portrayed by Sara Martins as DS Camille Bordey (Series 1–4), Joséphine Jobert as DS Florence Cassell (Series 4–8, 10–11), Aude Lagastelois-Bidé as DS Madeleine Dumas (Series 8–9) and Shantol Jackson as DS Naomi Thomas (Series 11–). Both Jobert's and Jackson's characters were initially Sergeants before being promoted to DSs.

The team members of lower-rank have included: Danny John-Jules as officer Dwayne Myers from (Series 1–7), Gary Carr as sergeant Fidel Best (Series 1–3), Tobi Bakare as officer/later sergeant JP Hooper (Series 4–10), Shyko Amos as officer Ruby Patterson (Series 8–9), Tahj Miles as trainee officer/later officer Marlon Pryce (Series 10–) and Ginny Holder as trainee officer Darlene Curtis (Series 11–). Holder's character previously featured in Series 7 as a civilian.

Additionally, Don Warrington portrays police commissioner Selwyn Patterson and Élizabeth Bourgine portrays bar-owner, and later Mayor, Catherine Bordey, Camille Bordey's mother. Both have appeared in almost every episode since the programme began. 

Death in Paradise was first announced on 9 December 2010 by the BBC; commissioned by controller of BBC Drama Commissioning Ben Stephenson. It was revealed that the show would be produced by Red Planet Pictures and Atlantique Productions, in association with BBC Worldwide and Kudos Film and Television for BBC One and France Télévisions. The idea for Death in Paradise came from Robert Thorogood, whose idea was formed after reading a report of a suspected murder in the Caribbean during the Cricket World Cup. Filming for the first series began in spring 2011, with the first series airing between October and December 2011. On 11 January 2012, Stephenson announced that a second series comprising eight episodes had been commissioned. The second series ran from January to February 2013. Since then, Death in Paradise has been recommissioned each year, and aired in January of each following year.

Series 13 and 14, along with two Christmas specials, were announced at the conclusion of series 12. The 2023 Christmas special would be episode 99, meaning series 13 would begin with the show's 100th episode.

Series overview

Episodes

Series 1 (2011)

Series 2 (2013)

Series 3 (2014)

Series 4 (2015)

Series 5 (2016)

Series 6 (2017)

Series 7 (2018)

Series 8 (2019)

Series 9 (2020)

Series 10 (2021)

Christmas Special (2021)

Series 11 (2022)

Christmas Special (2022)

Series 12 (2023)

References

External links 
List of Death in Paradise episodes at BBC Online

List of Death in Paradise episodes at epguides

Episodes
Lists of British crime television series episodes
Lists of British drama television series episodes